Beethoven's Great Love (French: Un grand amour de Beethoven is a 1936 French historical musical drama film directed by Abel Gance and starring Harry Baur, Annie Ducaux and Jany Holt. It portrays the career of the composer Ludwig van Beethoven. In Britain and the United States it was sometimes alternatively titled The Life and Loves of Beethoven.

It was shot at the Cité Elgé Studios in Paris. The film's sets were designed by the art director Jacques Colombier.

Synopsis
In Vienna in the early 1800s while working as a musical tutor, two of Beethoven's pupils are in love with him. One ends up marrying a count instead while the other spends years of unrequited love as his fiancée. Beethoven moves to Heiligenstadt to dedicate himself to his music, and overcoming his growing deafness, composes a series of masterworks.

Cast
 Harry Baur as Ludwig van Beethoven
 Annie Ducaux as Thérèse de Brunswick
 Jany Holt as Juliette Guicciardi
 Jean-Louis Barrault as Karl van Beethoven
 Jean Debucourt as Le comte Robert Gallenberg 
 André Nox as 	Humpholz
 Gaston Dubosc as Anton Schindler
 Sylvie Gance as 	La mère de l'enfant mort 
 Georges Paulais as Le médecin 
 Georges Saillard as Breuning 
 Jean Pâqui as Pierrot
 Jane Marken as Esther Frechet - la cuisinière 
 Marcel Dalio as L'éditeur Steiner 
 André Bertic as Johann van Beethoven
 Roger Blin as de Ries
 Dalméras as Franz Schubert
 Lucas Gridoux as Nikolaus Zmeskall
 Yolande Laffon as La comtesse Guicciardi
 Lucien Rozenberg as Le comte Guicciardi
 Paul Pauley as Schuppanzigh

See also

List of films featuring the deaf and hard of hearing

References

Bibliography
 King, Norman. Abel Gance: A Politics of Spectacle. Bloomsbury Academic, 1984.

External links
 
 

French historical musical films
French musical drama films
French black-and-white films
Films directed by Abel Gance
1930s historical musical films
1930s musical drama films
Depictions of Ludwig van Beethoven on film
Cultural depictions of Franz Schubert
Films set in the 1800s
Films set in the 1810s
Films set in the 1820s
Films set in Vienna
1936 films
1936 drama films
1930s French films